CGWA may refer to:

 Center for Gravitational Wave Astronomy at the University of Texas, Brownsville
 Controlled Ground Water Area